Draude is a surname. Notable people with the surname include:

June Draude (born 1949), Canadian politician
Kristian Draude (born 1977), German musician
Thomas V. Draude (born 1940), retired officer of the United States Marine Corps

See also
Drude (surname)